Tiger and Lion Safari, Thyavarekoppa, Shimoga is located the state of Karnataka, India, with an area of , at a distance of about  from Shimoga town, and  from Bangalore. Started in 1988, it is Karnataka's second safari park, after Bannerghatta National Park near Bangalore. Despite the name, the lion and tiger are neither the only animals here, nor are they the only big cats here.

Fauna

Felidae

Asiatic lions, Bengal tigers and Indian leopards are kept in separate enclosures and they are viewed by a guided "safari" vehicle. A relatively rare black panther was born here during 2012, and is available for public view as a caged animal.

In 2005, a tigress gave birth to cubs here. On 2 March 2006, four tigers killed a casual laborer who fell down while repairing iron gates. A tigress which strayed into nearby villages was captured and kept in this safari.

Birds

More than 11 different species of birds were kept in cages for display. They include the white pheasant, silver pheasant, red junglefowl, and love bird.

See also
 Etawah Safari Park
 Bangalore Division
 Bayalu Seeme
 Konkan
 Tiger versus lion
 Western Ghats
 Wildlife of India

Notes

Safari parks
Tiger reserves of India
Wildlife sanctuaries in Karnataka
Shimoga
1988 establishments in Karnataka